Pollachi is a town and a taluk headquarters in Coimbatore district.

Pollachi may also refer to:

 Pollachi (Lok Sabha constituency)
 Pollachi taluk
 Pollachi(South) Block
 Pollachi(North) Block
 Pollachi (state assembly constituency)
 Pollachi Junction railway station
 Pollachi Mappillai